Shane Robertson (born 10 December 1962) is a former Australian rules footballer who played for North Melbourne in the Victorian Football League (VFL) in 1985. 

He made his VFL debut on the same day as his older brother, Rohan Robertson.  His father Keith also played for North Melbourne in between 1957 and 1963. Robertson's Career came to end due to him having a career ending leg injury that put him out of sport

References

External links

1962 births
Living people
North Melbourne Football Club players
Australian rules footballers from Victoria (Australia)
Wangaratta Rovers Football Club players